Eberhard Kummer (2 August 1940 – 12 July 2019) was an Austrian concert singer, lawyer and an expert of medieval music from Vienna.

Kummer was born in Krems an der Donau.  He played the hurdy-gurdy, the harp and the guitar, and made important contribution to the restoration of medieval and the Austrian folksong. He received training as a classical bass-baritone. After an initial career as classical singer, he gradually specialized in restoring traditional Austrian folksongs and original medieval music from Europe, such as the German epic Nibelungenlied or medieval Minnelieder.

Discography

Solo Recordings
 1978, 1981: Alt-Wiener Volkslieder. Preiser Records, EMI-Electrola, Cologne (LPs und CDs)
 1978: Der Mönch von Salzburg / Cesar Bresgen, Help Austria Records HAS 174.
 1984: Das Nibelungenlied. Pan-Verlag, Wien (LP)
 1984: Der Mord auf der Mölkerbastei. Pan-Verlag, Wien (LP)
 1986: "Lieder und Reigen des Mittelalters - Neidhart von Reuental" . Pan-Verlag, Wien.(LP Nr. 117 001)
 1987: Ballade von Wolf Dietrich und andere Balladen. Lyraphon, Salzburg (MC Nr. unbekannt)
 1990: Max und Moritz von Wilhelm Busch. Extempore Records, Linz (MC LC 8075)
 1993: Sentimentale Volkslieder vom Tod, von Räubern und Mördern gem. with Elisabeth Orth. Preiser Records, Vienna (CD)
 1995: Das Buch von den Wienern – aufgeschrieben von Michel Beheim. Preiser Records, Wien (CD 90206)
 1997: Alt-Wiener Volkslieder I + II. ORF und Preiser Records, Wien (CD 90038, 90131)
 1998: Das Nibelungenlied, Walther von der Vogelweide, Kürenberger. Extraplatte, Wien (nicht identisch mit der LP von 1984, sondern Neuaufnahme: CD, Stereo 93415)
 1998: Es fuegt sich. Lieder des Oswald von Wolkenstein. Preiser Records, Wien (CD, Stereo 91051)
 2004: Laurin – Epos und Schwank im mittelalterlichen Tirol. ORF, Wien (u.a. Ausschnitte aus dem Laurin-Epos, den Dietrich-Epen von der Virginal sowie dem Riesen Ecke, dem Willehalm Wolframs von Eschenbach, dem Iwein Hartmanns von Aue sowie zwei Schwankmären: Edition Alte Musik CD 363)
 2004: Lieder zur Leier & Wissenswertes von Weihnachten. Gem. mit Helga Maria Wolf. Extraplatte, Wien (CD LC 8202)
 2006: Nibelungenlied, Complete Recording. The Chaucer Studio, Provo, Utah/ États-Unis (zwei MP3-CDs )
 2007: Die Lieder des Hugo von Montfort. ORF, Wien (Edition Alte Musik Zwei CDs + DVD, CD 3011)

Productions where he participated
 1980: Lieder und Duette der Romantik. Interpret/innen: Guy-Kummer, Elisabeth (Alt). Kummer, Eberhard (Bass). Ortner, Roman (Klavier). LP, Wien : Preiser
 1983: In adventu Domini : vorweihnachtl. Musik von 1200 bis 1600. Wien : Mirror Music
 1986: Scholi singt. Lieder & Balladen des ausgejagten Studenten LP Lyraphon 580441, Seekirchen/Salzburg: Tonstudio "Die Mühle".
 1990: Mozart, Tänze und Menuette. Wiener Akademie Martin Haselböck auf Originalinstrumenten. Novalis, Schweiz ??? (CD 150 059-1)
 1993: Es ist ein schön Ding umb ein Rosen. Live-Mitschnitt der Uraufführung im Rahmen des Carinthischen Sommers in Villach. Carinthischer Sommer (CD 1111)
 1994: Hans Sachs und seine Zeit. Clemencic Consort. Stradivarius dischi, Milano (Neuauflage 2010)
 1997: Meilensteine der Volksmusik. Volkskultur Niederösterreich, Atzenbrugg. CD-Serie. Advent und Weihnachten in den Bergen. Verlag ??? München
 1998: Der Staat ist in Gefahr! Lieder zur Wiener Revolution 1848. Wiener Volksliedwerk und Extraplatte, Wien (CD LC 8202)
 1999: Das Narrenschiff - Mitschnitt der Aufführung des gleichnamigen Theaterstückes bei den Sommerspielen im Stift Altenburg. CD, Wien: Preiser: 1999
 2000: Zu ebener Erde und erster Stock. Wiener Lieder und Tänze 1760-1860. "Die Eipeldauer". Extraplatte, Wien (CD EX 443-2)
 2002: Mittelalterliche Lieder und Tänze. Paul Hofhaimer Consort Salzburg.Verlag der Bibliothek der Provinz, Weitra / Weinberg Records, Kefermarkt (CD SW 010173)
 2004: Die geistliche Nachtigall. Weihnachts- und Hirtenmusik aus dem Alten Österreich. Clemencic-Consort Arte Nova Classics, München. (CDLC 3480)
 2005: Hadamar von Laber - Jagd nach Liebe. CD, München: Oehms Classics, München. Clemencic-Consort (CD OC 519)
 2009: Wir zogen gegen Napoleon. Musik der napoleonischen Epoche. (CD LC 16167)

External links
 (German) Eberhard Kummer's entry on the Austria Forum

1940 births
2019 deaths
Austrian guitarists
Austrian harpists
Austrian jurists
20th-century Austrian male singers
Bass-baritones
21st-century Austrian male singers